Verkhneye Dubrovo is the name of several inhabited localities in Russia.

Urban localities
Verkhneye Dubrovo, Sverdlovsk Oblast, a work settlement in Beloyarsky District of Sverdlovsk Oblast

Rural localities
Verkhneye Dubrovo, Smolensk Oblast, a village in Prechistenskoye Rural Settlement of Dukhovshchinsky District of Smolensk Oblast